The Vancouver Titans are a Canadian esports team founded in 2018 that compete in the Overwatch League (OWL). The Titans began playing competitive Overwatch in the 2019 season.

All rostered players during the OWL season (including the playoffs) are included, even if they did not make an appearance.

All-time roster

References

External links 
 Vancouver Titans roster

 
Vancouver Titans
Vancouver